{{safesubst:#invoke:RfD||2=Alan Umstead (musician)|month = March
|day =  9
|year = 2023
|time = 18:46
|timestamp = 20230309184658

|content=
REDIRECT Nashville String Machine

}}